Josh Jackson (born 2 October 1980 in Fergus, Ontario) is a Canadian rugby union player. He can play at lock or in the backrow.

Jackson currently plays his rugby with Stade Montois in the French Rugby Pro D2. He has played previously for the Canadian club Castaway Wanderers and French clubs Stade Bordelais and Bordeaux Bègles.

He has been part of the Canadian national team since his debut on 23 August 2003, in a 21–11 victory over Uruguay. He participated in both the 2003 and 2007 Rugby World Cups.

Jackson currently holds 22 caps but has yet to score his first points for Canada.

References

External links
Josh Jackson International Statistics

1980 births
Living people
Canadian rugby union players
Rugby union locks
Canada international rugby union players
Stade Bordelais players
Union Bordeaux Bègles players
Canadian expatriate sportspeople in France
Stade Montois players
Canadian expatriate rugby union players
Expatriate rugby union players in France